The Strangerhood is a comedy series created by Rooster Teeth Productions. The series is produced primarily by using the machinima technique of synchronizing video footage from video game to pre-recorded dialogue and other audio. The animation is created using the video game The Sims 2 as a parody of sitcoms and reality television. The series details the lives of eight "assorted stereotypes" who wake up living in a neighborhood called Strangerhood Lane, with no memory of who they are, where they are, or how they got there.

The Strangerhood is the second machinima series of four from Rooster Teeth Productions. It is preceded by Red vs. Blue: The Blood Gulch Chronicles and followed by PANICS. The series is a parody of popular culture, namely television shows such as Desperate Housewives, Lost, 24, and American Idol.

The episodes are released online at the Rooster Teeth and The Sims 2 websites, and a DVD of the first season was released on May 5, 2006, available from GameStop stores in the United States and online worldwide.

The second season was a stretch goal for the Lazer Team's indiegogo crowdfunding campaign. Season two consists of four episodes and was released as daily episodes from September 29, to October 3, 2015.

Plot

One morning in the near future, a group of assorted stereotypes awake in a strange town with no memory of who they are or where they came from. Their only clues come from the assorted labels that hold their names (Wade's name badge and Sam's underwear) and a mysteriously creepy voice issuing from their televisions. Over the course of the season, they endure many  trials including an unusual reality show kitchen task, a murder mystery among their group, a secret affair and of course their own strange personalities before they learn the horrifying truth behind the unusual events of the Strangerhood.

Strangerhood Studios
Strangerhood Studios is a series of shorts, each about one or two minutes long, featuring the characters of The Strangerhood. The story, however, departs from the main plot of The Strangerhood. For example, the characters are back in the outside world, not trapped on Strangerhood Lane. Strangerhood Studios was created when the Independent Film Channel asked Rooster Teeth Productions and machinima artist Paul Marino to create six shorts for television broadcast.

Characters
As with Red vs. Blue, The Strangerhood features a cast of diverse characters, each skewed in different ways and to varying degrees. Their natures are summed up by the Omnipotent Voice in episode 2 when it booms "Silence, assorted stereotypes!". There are nine main characters, and a small number of supporting characters.

Sam is the straight man of the series, often serious in comparison to the other residents; he often describes the situations the residents find themselves in as being ridiculous. Wade, Sam's housemate, is a stereotypical stoner, with bloodshot eyes and memory problems, and is frequently confused by events. Dr Chalmers is an elderly, curmudgeonly intellectual, frequently irritated by his fellow residents. Tovar is a confused ethnic minority, with a silly accent and a penchant for doing foolish things. Dutchmiller is a yuppie stereotype, enthusiastic about everything alternative. Catherine is a stereotypical dumb blonde, who uses other people to her own ends. Nikki is a teenager who is curious as to what is actually going on. Griggs is a stereotypical "tough guy" with camouflage facepaint and a highly aggressive attitude, and is Nikki's biological father in the present time.

Supporting characters
The Omnipotent Voice: A mysterious voice that can project itself through various devices and objects such as computers and newspapers and who orders the residents about.
Evil Tovar/Tobar: Tovar's evil twin, created by accident. He is "pure evil" while the other Tovar is "pure moron."
The Garden Gnome: A garden gnome that follows Griggs around and talks to him in an unintelligible language.
Sam: A man who lives in isolation underground throughout the series and is the real Omnipotent Voice. Strangerhood Sam stole his name along with his labeled underwear.

Other characters
In Episode Six "Idol Desperation", Sam calls a number of characters on the telephone to tell them about Nikki.  At first, it is the main characters, then moving onto other characters from the sim world, such as the Grim Reaper, the Social Bunny, and some objects such as the gnome and the pink flamingo.

Production
Animation for The Strangerhood is recorded on three separate computers. Owing to the limitations of the simulation engine, it was necessary to create a number of clones of each character, each with a different expression — happy, sad, angry, and so forth. The unused versions are herded into an out-of-viewpoint room and exchanged as necessary to obtain the various facial expressions. Lines are used that best match the mouth movements and gestures of the characters.

"If we need them to kiss for a scene," explains Burns, "we have to develop their relationship until they're attracted to each other."

In June 2014, it was announced that a second season would be produced if the Indiegogo funds for the Rooster Teeth film Lazer Team surpassed US$2.25 million. This goal was reached during RTX on 5 July 2014, and a second season was published at the end of September 2015.

Distribution
Videos are released in QuickTime (QT), DivX, and Windows Media Video (WMV) formats. All released episodes of the season in production are freely available from the official site, in 360-by-240 resolution.

References

External links

Brief Wired news article on The Sims 2 technique
The Strangerhood unofficial resource site (via archive.org)

2004 web series debuts
2006 web series endings
2000s American animated films
English-language films
Film serials
Machinima works
American parody films
Rooster Teeth
2015 web series debuts
2015 web series endings
2010s American animated films